The furtive fallacy is an informal fallacy of emphasis in which historical outcomes are asserted to be the result of hidden (furtive) misconduct or wrongdoing by decision makers. Historian David Hackett Fischer identified it as the belief that significant facts of history are necessarily sinister, and that "history itself is a story of causes mostly insidious and results mostly invidious." Although it may lead to a conspiracy theory, the fallacy itself consists in the assumption that misdeeds lurk behind every page of history. In its extreme form, the fallacy represents general paranoia.

Fischer identified several examples of the fallacy, with particular attention to the works of Charles A. Beard and his critic Forrest McDonald. Beard had argued that Franklin Roosevelt secretly and intentionally maneuvered the country into World War II. Although some critics accused him of falsifying the historical record, Fisher believed that Beard was merely pursuing a long-held misconception about how history occurs. McDonald, meanwhile, offered sensational descriptions of the early United States in which history unfolded through episodes of corruption and drunkenness.

Richard Hofstadter discussed the fallacy before Fischer, although not by name. In reviewing histories from the Progressive Era, Hofstadter noted that the progressive historians tended to assume that reality was always hidden and ignored, being determined by bribes, rebates, and secret business deals.

A modification of the furtive fallacy holds that when the historical record provides no evidence explaining a particular set of events, this is itself evidence of a furtive cause.

The idea of the furtive fallacy was criticized by Jeffrey M. Bale, author of the book The Darkest Sides of Politics, who cited the risk of historians underestimating the influence of political secret societies, vanguard parties, and intelligence agencies.

Notes

Further reading
 

Informal fallacies
Conspiracy theories